Plombières may refer to:
 Plombières, a municipality of Belgium
 Plombières-les-Bains, Vosges, France (site of the Treaty of Plombières)
 Plombières-lès-Dijon, Côte-d'Or, France
Plombières (dessert), a French ice cream dish